"Nice and Lovely" is a song by Jamaican reggae artist Shaggy, released as the second single from his debut studio album, Pure Pleasure (1993). The song was released on June 25, 1993, following the success of his debut single, "Oh Carolina". It was considered much of a step away from the simplicity of the first single, and as such, the release was surrounded by controversy. "Nice and Lovely" was only released in the United Kingdom, however, promotional copies of the single were issued in the United States. It peaked at No. 46 on the UK Singles Chart, forty-five places lower than "Oh Carolina".

Critical reception
Charles Aaron from Spin commented, "Fantasy film noir dancehall reggae, with our heroes playing it real cool, ducking in and out of doorways, flashing nickel-plated style. Talking the sweetest smelling trash this side of Front Street, Shaggy rhymes "chocolate fudge" with "lipstick smudge". And his Brooklyn production team, Sting International, is hilariously talented."

Music video
The accompanying music video for the song premiered in May 1993, and in 2009, was made available via Shaggy's official Vevo account. It features Shaggy performing the song in an underground setting.

Track listing

 United Kingdom
 CD single
 "Nice and Lovely" (Radio Edit) – 3:28
 "Nice and Lovely" (Moore R&B Mix) – 4:21
 "Oh Carolina" (Konders Flatbush Mix) – 3:04
 "'Fraid to Ask" – 3:15

 Cassette
 "Nice and Lovely" (Radio Edit) – 3:28
 "Nice and Lovely" (Moore R&B Mix) – 4:21

 12" vinyl
 "Nice and Lovely" (Original Mix) – 3:43
 "Nice and Lovely" (Moore R&B Mix) – 4:21
 "Nice and Lovely" (Livingstone Ragga Mix) – 3:55
 "Oh Carolina" (Konders Flatbush Mix) – 3:04

 12" vinyl – Promotional
 "Nice and Lovely" (Original Mix) – 3:43
 "Nice and Lovely" (Moore R&B Mix) – 4:21
 "Nice and Lovely" (Livingstone Ragga Mix) – 3:55
 "Oh Carolina" (Konders Flatbush Mix) – 3:04
 "Oh Carolina" (Break Beats) 
 "'Fraid to Ask" (Livingsting Remix)

 United States
 CD single
 "Nice and Lovely" (Radio Edit) – 3:28
 "Nice and Lovely" (Moore R&B Mix) – 4:21
 "Nice and Lovely" (Frankie's Hip Hop Mix) – 4:35
 "Nice and Lovely" (Horn Mix) – 3:54
 "Victoria's Secret" – 4:09

 7" vinyl
 "Nice and Lovely" (Radio Edit) – 3:28
 "Victoria's Secret" – 4:09

 12" vinyl
 "Nice and Lovely" (Radio Edit) – 3:28
 "Nice and Lovely" (Ram Mix) – 3:54
 "Nice and Lovely" (12" Dub) – 4:01
 "Nice and Lovely" (Moore R&B Mix) – 4:21
 "Nice and Lovely" (Frankie's Hip Hop Mix) – 4:35
 "Victoria's Secret" – 4:09

Chart positions

References

1993 singles
Shaggy (musician) songs
1993 songs
Songs written by Shaggy (musician)
Virgin Records singles